Pasini is an Italian surname. Notable people with the surname include:

Alberto Pasini (1826–1899), Italian painter
Antonio Pasini (1770–1845), Italian painter
Camilla Pasini (1875–1935), Italian opera singer
Cesare Pasini (born 1950), Roman Catholic priest and Prefect of the Vatican Apostolic Library since 2007
Claudia Pasini (born 1939), Italian fencer
Damien Pasini (born 1984), French racing driver
Fabio Pasini (born 1980), Italian cross-country skier
Humbert Francis "Pat" Pasini (1885–1964), American football, basketball, baseball, and track coach and college athletics administrator
Lazzaro Pasini (1861–1949), Italian painter
Carolina Pasini-Vitale (187 –1959), Italian soprano
Mariano Pasini (born 1979), Argentine footballer
Mattia Pasini (born 1985), Italian motorcycle racer
Nicola Pasini (born 1991), Italian footballer
Renato Pasini (born 1977), Italian cross-country skier
Timoteo Pasini (1829–1888), Italian classical composer, conductor and pianist

Italian-language surnames